"I'm So Afraid" is a song written by Lindsey Buckingham for the British-American rock band Fleetwood Mac for their tenth album, Fleetwood Mac. The song was intended for a second Buckingham Nicks album, but the album never came to fruition.

Background
Like all other Buckingham and Nicks compositions on Fleetwood Mac's 1975 eponymous album, “I'm So Afraid” was written before Buckingham joined Fleetwood Mac. "It made the process of cutting that first album much easier than it would've otherwise been, working with people we'd never worked with before."

"I'm So Afraid" is the final track of the album, and was released as the B-side to the song "Over My Head". It is a hard rock song, atypical of Fleetwood Mac's songs (at least following the Peter Green era), but it quickly became a live staple showcasing Lindsey Buckingham's guitar skills. The studio version of the song is in G natural minor, but live versions are usually transposed down to F natural minor.

The music is borrowed from Benjamin Britten's short song "This little babe" from his suite, A Ceremony of Carols. Buckingham incorporated musical themes from church music in "I'm So Afraid", and used the guitar more as an orchestral instrument.

Producer Ken Caillat noted how different "I'm So Afraid" sounded during live performances. Compared to the album version, which Caillat described as "mellower with a folk rock vibe", live performances saw "I'm So Afraid" become a “faster, hard-edged song. The song appeared on all of the band's live albums recorded after its release, including Live, The Dance, Fleetwood Mac: Live in Boston, and on the 2015 box set of Tusk. The live recording from The Dance was included in an edited form on the US 2002 and UK 2009 release of the greatest hits compilation album The Very Best of Fleetwood Mac. Buckingham also included the song on his solo live albums Live at the Bass Performance Hall, Songs from the Small Machine: Live in L.A., and One Man Show.

The song was also featured in a second-season episode of Miami Vice in 1985.

Track listing
US vinyl, 7", Single (Reprise Records - RPS 1339)
"Over My Head" – 3:17
"I'm So Afraid" – 4:15

Personnel
Lindsey Buckingham – lead vocals, electric guitars, acoustic guitar
Christine McVie – keyboards
Stevie Nicks – backing vocals
John McVie – bass guitar
Mick Fleetwood – drums

References

Fleetwood Mac songs
1976 singles
Songs written by Lindsey Buckingham
Song recordings produced by Keith Olsen
Reprise Records singles